Jennifer Baker may refer to:

 Jenny Oaks Baker (born 1975), American violinist
 Jennifer Baker (journalist), Irish journalist